Gemmobacter nanjingensis is a Gram-negative, non-spore-forming, facultatively anaerobic, propanil-degrading and rod-shaped bacterium from the genus of Gemmobacter which has been isolated from activated sludge.

References

External links
Type strain of Gemmobacter nanjingensis at BacDive -  the Bacterial Diversity Metadatabase

Rhodobacteraceae
Bacteria described in 2012